Kelakoli (also Romanized as Kelākolī and Kalākolī) is a village in Pol Beh Pain Rural District, Simakan District, Jahrom County, Fars Province, Iran. At the 2006 census, its population was 708, in 138 families.

References 

Populated places in Jahrom County